Live at the Wiltern may refer to:

Live at the Wiltern (CPR album)
Live at the Wiltern (All-American Rejects album)
Live at the Wiltern (Florence and the Machine album)